Fair and Worm-er is a 1946 Warner Bros. Merrie Melodies cartoon directed by Chuck Jones. The short was released on September 28, 1946.

The title is a pun on Fair and Warmer.

The premise greatly resembles and builds upon that of the 1942 Tex Avery cartoon, The Early Bird Dood It!, which is about a worm chased by a bird chased by a cat, and has a much darker ending.

Plot
A worm, wielding a knife and fork, rushes to dine on a large apple that has fallen to the ground when he is immediately chased by a hungry black crow. The crow pursues the worm until he is confronted by a cat. The cat runs after the crow, only to find itself in the sights of a vicious dog. The dog harasses the cat until he is suddenly set upon by the local dog catcher. He is stopped in his tracks by his wife (armed with a rolling pin) who professes that she is not "scared of man nor beast". A nearby mouse informs her that he is a beast and snarls, setting her off running and screaming. Her husband, in a Jimmy Durante voice, watches the woman tearing away, chased by the mouse, and says, "Everybody wants to get into the act."

From there, the various protagonists continue their pursuit of each other - all stemming from the worm still attempting to get the apple. The crow makes an intellectual decision that, within this busy group, he must help the dog. He reasons that: Dogs chase cats...Cats chase birds...I'm a bird...Therefore: I gotta help the dog.

A series of scenarios plays out during which each character goes after their prey while being harried by their own nemesis. An encounter with a skunk who may or may not be Pepé Le Pew unites them all in self-preservation and escape. Throughout, the dog catcher's wife continues to run away from the mouse.

At the conclusion of the cartoon, an unseen narrator asks the worm if he must go through this routine every day just to get something to eat. The worm says, "Eat it nothing - this is the last furnished apartment in town." Whereupon he opens a door in the apple upon which hangs a "Vacancy" sign. As the short fades out, the worm exits his new home wearing a robe and carrying a towel, heading for a nearby second apple with a door, presumably containing shower facilities.

References

External links
 

1946 films
Merrie Melodies short films
1946 animated films
1946 short films
Short films directed by Chuck Jones
Animated films about birds
Animated films about cats
Animated films about dogs
Pepé Le Pew films
American chase films
Films scored by Carl Stalling
1940s Warner Bros. animated short films
Films with screenplays by Michael Maltese
Films about worms